Megève is a commune in the Haute-Savoie department in the Auvergne-Rhône-Alpes region in Southeastern France with a population of more than 3,000 residents. The town is well known as a ski resort near Mont Blanc in the French Alps. Conceived in the 1920s as a French alternative to St. Moritz by the Rothschilds, it was the first purpose-built resort in the Alps. Originally it was a prime destination for the French aristocracy; it remains one of the most famous and affluent ski resorts in the world.

History
The town started its development as a ski resort in the 1910s, when the Rothschild family began spending their winter vacations there after becoming disenchanted with the Swiss resort St. Moritz. In 1921, Baroness Noémie de Rothschild (1888–1968) opened the Domaine du Mont d'Arbois, a luxury hotel which boosted the resort's development. By the 1950s Megève was one of the most popular ski resorts in Europe and attracted many wealthy individuals and celebrities. Nowadays it is still visited largely by affluent people  as is evidenced by the real estate prices.

Development
For the 2015–2016 winter season a six-seater chair opened replacing the two old Mont Joux chairs. Further additions include the latest branch of Folie Douce at the top of Mont Joux, introducing the chain's trademark Austrian-style afternoon party scene, which opened in the 2014–2015 season. This will be the fifth in the Folie Douce chain, which started in Val d'Isère and then spread to Val Thorens, Méribel and Alpe d'Huez.

Sports

Winter sports
Megève's Alpine skiing area, known as the "Domaine Évasion Mont Blanc", comprises Megève itself (Mont d'Arbois, L'Alpette, Rochebrune and Côte 2000); Saint-Gervais-les-Bains; Combloux; La Giettaz; Les Contamines-Montjoie and Saint-Nicolas-de-Véroce. The "Evasion Mont-Blanc" range covers approximately 445 km of the ski slopes.

On an area of  there are 116 lifts providing access to 219 slopes totaling .
 The 445 km of slopes are thus divided from hardest to easiest:  blacks,  reds,  blues and  greens. (See ski trail rating)
 The lifts: 67 platter lifts, 35 chairlifts and 13 gondola lifts and one cable car.

In addition, the "Domaine Évasion Mont Blanc" includes 18 cross-country skiing trails totaling .

The first three World Junior Figure Skating Championships were held in Megève in 1976, 1977 and 1978.

The Megève Polo Masters is an international polo tournament played on snow. The Snow Golf Cup is a unique golf tournament held on snow on Megève's Mont d'Arbois plateau.

As well as these winter sports, Megève also hosts winter events including an international curling tournament, a ski cross World Cup and a mogul skiing cup. There is also night skiing in February, a ski cross slope, an open-air ice rink, snowshoeing and dog sledding plus  of Nordic skiing in the region.

Summer sports
Megève is also a popular summer holiday destination and is especially renowned for its golfing opportunities.  It was the finishing town for stage 18 and the start town for stage 20 of the 2016 Tour de France.

Twin towns
Oberstdorf in Germany has, since 1970, been a twin town of Megève. It is also located in the mountains and famous for summer and winter holidays.

Honorary citizens
People awarded the honorary citizenship of Megève are:

Media

Megève is the ski resort featured in the beginning of the 1963 film Charade, where Audrey Hepburn's Regina Lampert meets Cary Grant's character. It is also the title of one of the tracks by composer Henry Mancini on the film's soundtrack.

Megève was one of four World Cup venues in the Alps featured in the 1969 film Downhill Racer, starring Robert Redford and Gene Hackman.

See also
 Communes of the Haute-Savoie department
 Megève Altiport

References

External links

 Official tourism website of Megève. 
 Official website of the municipality of Megève. 
 Megève local people, tradition. 

Communes of Haute-Savoie
Ski areas and resorts in France